Memoirs and Misinformation is a 2020 surrealist memoir/novel by Canadian-American actor Jim Carrey and novelist Dana Vachon, starring a fictionalized version of Carrey. The book has received critical acclaim.

Writing and release
Carrey and Vachon met at an art studio and started collaborating via Twitter a decade prior to the book's release and the origins of their collaboration went back eight years that eventually incorporated several disparate interests such as Arthurian legend and the nature of reality into a satirical memoir. Additionally, the book is an outgrowth of Carrey's interest in the artifice of celebrity and the nature of the self, which developed after his own rise to fame. The novel was announced in October 2019 and after being slated for a May 2020 release, the book was pushed back to July due to the COVID-19 pandemic.

The audio book version is narrated by Carrey's Dumb and Dumber co-star Jeff Daniels.

Reception

Critical reception
Kirkus Reviews praised the book for its absurdist comedy.

Sales
The book was a New York Times Bestseller. Sales peaked at 87 on the USA Today Best-Selling Books.

References

External links

Except of the audio version from Entertainment Weekly

2020 debut novels
Collaborative novels
Novels by Jim Carrey
American satirical novels
Works postponed due to the COVID-19 pandemic
Alfred A. Knopf books